The 1914 Tour de France was the 12th edition of Tour de France, one of cycling's Grand Tours. The Tour began in Paris on 28 June and Stage 8 occurred on 12 July with a flat stage to Marseille. The race finished in Paris on 26 July.

Stage 1
28 June 1914 — Paris to Le Havre, 

This stage happened on the same day as the assassination of Archduke Franz Ferdinand of Austria.

Stage 2
30 June 1914 — Le Havre to Cherbourg-en-Cotentin,

Stage 3
2 July 1914 — Cherbourg-en-Cotentin to Brest,

Stage 4
4 July 1914 — Brest to La Rochelle,

Stage 5
6 July 1914 — La Rochelle to Bayonne,

Stage 6
7 July 1914 — Bayonne to Luchon,

Stage 7
10 July 1914 — Luchon to Perpignan,

Stage 8
12 July 1914 — Perpignan to Marseille,

References

1914 Tour de France
Tour de France stages